The Ryukyuans in Brazil are Brazilian nationals of Ryukyuan descent.

History 
Many people were struggling economically in the Ryukyu Islands during the late 1800s and early 1900s. As a result, many Ryukyuans emigrated elsewhere to places such as Brazil, Peru, Hawaii and mainland Japan.

On June 18, 1908, the first migrants from Japan arrived at the port of Santos in São Paulo. Half of these migrants were Okinawans. Immigration from the Ryukyu Islands to Brazil would continue in the following years.

Demographics 
Ryukyuans in Brazil make up 9.4% (170,000) of the entire Brazilian Nikkei community (1,600,000), despite Ryukyuans making up only 1% of Japan's total population. The Nikkei communities in neighboring Peru and Argentina are majority Ryukyuan-descended.

The majority of Ryukyuans in South America specifically belong to the Okinawan subgroup.

See also 

 Ryukyuan people
 Ryukyuan diaspora
 Ryukyu Islands
 Japanese Brazilians

References 

Ryukyuan people